Frank Edward Ballenger (February 14, 1903 – June 14, 1984) was an American football, basketball, and track coach.  Ballenger was the head football coach at Adrian College in Adrian, Michigan. He held that position for the 1936 and 1937 seasons. His coaching record at Adrian was 4–14.  He received his bachelor of arts at Muskingum University. He was born in Cambridge, Ohio in on February 14, 1903.

Ballanger moved to Ball State Teachers College—now known as Ball State University—in 1939 and served there as an assistant football, basketball, and track coach and as an assistant professor of physical education.  After serving in the United States Army Air Forces during World War II, he returned to Ball State before joining the faculty at Kent State University, where he remained until his retirement.  Ballanger died on June 14, 1984, in Sun City Center, Florida.

Head coaching record

Football

References

1903 births
1984 deaths
Adrian Bulldogs athletic directors
Adrian Bulldogs football coaches
Adrian Bulldogs men's basketball coaches
Ball State Cardinals football coaches
Ball State Cardinals men's basketball coaches
College track and field coaches in the United States
Ball State University faculty
Kent State University faculty
Muskingum University alumni
United States Army Air Forces personnel of World War II
People from Cambridge, Ohio